This is a list of Jordanian princes from the accession of Abdullah I of the House of Hashem to the throne of the Jordan in 1946. Individuals holding the title of prince will usually also be styled "His Royal Highness"  (HRH). The wife of a Jordan prince will usually take the title and style of her husband.

List of Jordanian princes since 1946

 
Princes
Princes